Season 12 of the American competitive reality television series Hell's Kitchen premiered on March 13, 2014 on Fox.

Gordon Ramsay returned as the head chef as well as Andi Van Willigan and James Avery as the red team's and blue team's sous chefs respectively. Jean-Philippe Susilovic also returned as the maître d'. This was the first season to have two chefs quit. This season also for the first time to feature "Cook For Your Life" challenge, which would be featured on subsequent seasons. Instead of the dinner service, the challenge was added in the middle of the season, which tested one chef of each team based on an interview of each team by Ramsay. The contestant that failed the challenge would be eliminated.

Scott Commings won this season and received a head chef position at Gordon Ramsay Pub & Grill in Caesars Palace in Las Vegas, a prize retained for the previous season. Scott holds the record for the most nominations held by a winner (seven times), breaking Christina Machamer's record (season 4) of five nominations. This is the last season to date to feature 20 contestants, and for the second time set a record with two contestants choosing to leave the competition after Season 5 (with the difference that the two contestants from Season 5 chose to leave the competition due to medical reason).

Chefs
Twenty chefs competed in season 12. Jason Zepaltas previously competed in season 9 but withdrew before the first dinner service after falling ill during prep. He is the second chef to have competed in two seasons, after Robert Hesse (seasons 5 and 6), and Zepaltas was the first chef until the All-Star season to present two signature dishes to Ramsay.

Notes

Contestant progress

Episodes

Notes

References

Hell's Kitchen (American TV series)
2014 American television seasons